Al-Rashid, ar-Rashid ("the Righteous"), Al-Rasheed or Al Rasheed may refer to:

Ar-Rashīd, one of the names of God in Islam, meaning "Guide to the Right Path"

People

 Abdullah bin Ali Al Rashid, founder of the Emirate of Jabal Shammar

 Abdulaziz bin Mutaib Al Rashid, Emir of Jabal Shammar from 1897 to 1906
Abdulaziz bin Saud Al Rashid, son of Fahda bint Asi bin Shuraim Al Shammari and Rashidi Emir Saud bin Abdulaziz Al Rashid
Ali Al-Rashid, Kuwaiti politician

 Hannah Al Rashid, Indonesian actress

Harun al-Rashid, the fifth Abbasid Caliph, 786–809.
Abu'l-Futuh al-Hasan ibn Ja'far, briefly anti-Caliph in 1012, claimed the regnal name al-Rashid
Al-Rashid Billah, the Caliph of Baghdad, from 1135 to 1136.
Mohamed Al-Rashed, Sudanese footballer
Mohammed Al-Rashid, Saudi Arabian footballer
 Al-Rashid of Morocco (Moulay Al-Rashid ibn Sharif) Sultan of Morocco from 1666 to 1672
Nasser Ibrahim Al-Rashid, Saudi businessman and billionaire.

Located in Baghdad, Iraq
Al-Rashid, Baghdad, an administrative district
Al Rasheed Street
Al-Rasheed Airport
Al Rasheed Hotel
Al Rasheed TV, a satellite TV channel based in Baghdad
Al-Rasheed SC, a defunct Iraqi football club based in Baghdad
Al Rasheed University College, a private university

Other uses
Emirate of Al-Rashīd, a pre-Saudi Arabian state in the Nejd region of Arabia, existing from the mid-nineteenth century to 1921
Rashidi dynasty, a historic dynasty of the Arabian Peninsula
Al Rashid Trust, charity front of Taliban and Al-Qaeda

See also
 Rashid (disambiguation)

Names of God in Islam